Türker is a Turkish male name which means "brave Turk". It may refer to:

Given name
 Türker Armaner, Istanbul-based writer
 Türker İnanoğlu, Turkish screenwriter
Türker Özenbaş, Turkish sports shooter

Surname
 Berç Türker Keresteciyan, Turkish bank executive
Masum Türker, Turkish politician
Mert Naci Türker, Turkish tennis player
 Suat Türker, Turkish-German football player

Surnames
Turkish-language surnames
Turkish masculine given names